Terry Gou (born 18 October 1950) is a Taiwanese billionaire businessman who is the Founder and former chairman and chief executive officer of Foxconn. Foxconn is the world's largest contract manufacturer of electronics, with factories in several countries, mostly in mainland China where it employs 1.2 million people and is its largest private employer and exporter.

Early life
Gou was born in Banqiao Township, Taipei County (now Banqiao District, New Taipei). His parents lived in mainland China's Shanxi Province before the Chinese Civil War and fled to Taiwan in 1949. As the second child of his family, Gou received education from elementary school to post college. After graduation, he continued to work in a rubber factory, working at a grinding wheel, and medicine plant until the age of 24. Gou has an older sister and two younger brothers, Gou Tai-chiang and Tony Gou, who have both become successful businesspeople as well.

Hon Hai

Terry Gou founded Hon Hai in Taiwan in 1974 with $7,500 ($44,000 in 2021 US dollars) in startup money and ten elderly workers, making plastic parts for television sets in a rented shed in Tucheng, a suburb of Taipei. A turning point came in 1980 when he received an order from Atari to make the console joystick. He further expanded his business in the 1980s by embarking on an 11-month trip across the US in search of customers.  As an aggressive salesman, Gou arrived uninvited into many companies headquarters and was able to get additional orders, despite having security called on him multiple times.

In 1988 he opened his first factory in mainland China, in Shenzhen, where his largest factory remains today. Operations in China significantly increased in scale when Gou vertically integrated the assembly process and facilities for workers. The manufacturing site became a campus that included housing, dining, medical care and burial for the workers, and even chicken farming to supply the cafeteria.

In 1996, Hon Hai started building chassis for Compaq desktops. This was a breakthrough moment that led to building the bare bones chassis for other high-profile customers, including HP, IBM, and Apple. Within just a few years, Foxconn grew into a consumer electronics giant.

In 2016, Gou's net worth was US$5.6 billion. By August 2017, Forbes listed his net worth at US$10.6 billion.

Gou is also the main owner of HMD Global, which is a company founded in 2016 to sell Nokia branded phones. HMD buys the R&D, manufacturing and distribution from FIH Ltd, which is part of Hon Hai group.

Gou drew controversy when he made comments during a board meeting about employees that were poorly translated into English as "Hon Hai has a workforce of over one million worldwide and as human beings are also animals, to manage one million animals gives me a headache." Through Foxconn, Gou would protest that the translation was poor and took his comments out of context.

Gou argued that Apple should move its manufacturing out of China to Taiwan. The comments came after he confirmed he will step down from his role as Foxconn chairman.

Later career
In April 2021, Gou became the biggest shareholder in the biotech company Eirgenix.

Political stances
Gou first joined the Kuomintang in 1970, but allowed his membership to lapse after 2000. In the 2012 Taiwan presidential election, Gou endorsed Ma Ying-jeou, stating that Ma was an "experienced, outstanding helmsman." After Donald Trump won the 2016 United States presidential election, Gou was the subject of a spoof open letter in Bloomberg, in which author Tim Culpan was severely critical of Trump. The article was mistakenly reported as having been written by Gou himself.

Political career
From 2016, it was widely reported that Gou was considering a 2020 Taiwanese presidential bid, and speculation continued into 2017. He rejoined the Kuomintang in April 2019. On 17 April 2019, Gou announced his intention to run in the Kuomintang primary for the 2020 presidential election. Gou declared that he had been instructed by the sea goddess Mazu in a dream to run as a candidate in the 2020 presidential election of the Republic of China. He finished second in the 2019 Kuomintang presidential primary, with 27.7% of the vote. On 12 September 2019, Gou announced his withdrawal from the Kuomintang. Four days later, Gou stated that he would not participate in the 2020 presidential election as an independent candidate. Gou was offered the top position on the Taiwan People's Party party list for the 2020 legislative election, but declined such a bid.

Personal life
Gou and his first wife, Serena Lin (1950–2005), have a son who works in the film and real estate industries and a daughter who worked in the financial sector. Gou founded an educational charity with Lin in 2000 and intended to eventually give away one third of his wealth to charity. After Gou's wife died, Gou's daughter assumed leadership in the charity.

In the 1990s, Gou had an extramarital affair with Chen Chung-mei, a bar girl according to Gou, who had a private investigator videotape her and Gou having sex in order to blackmail Gou for money. While Gou first agreed to pay the money, when they next met he had police arrest Chen and the private investigator, Hsu Ching-wei, and sued them for extortion, stating he knew the affair would become "exposed one way or another".

In 2002 he bought a Roztěž castle near Kutná Hora in the Czech Republic for $30 million.

In 2005, Serena Lin died of breast cancer at the age of 55. Gou's younger brother, Tony Gou, died in 2007 of leukemia. Also that year, Hsu Ching-wei accused Gou of having an affair during the 1990s. Gou married his second wife, choreographer Delia Tseng (born 1974) on 26 July 2008. Tseng and Gou have three children. Together, they have decided to give 90% of Gou's wealth away.

References

External links 
Hon Hai Precision
Yonglin.org.tw, his charity organization

Taiwanese chief executives
Taiwanese billionaires
1950 births
Living people
Foxconn people
Businesspeople from Taipei
Taiwanese company founders
Businesspeople from New Taipei